The Play That Goes Wrong is a 2012 play by Henry Lewis, Jonathan Sayer, and Henry Shields of Mischief Theatre Company. It won Best New Comedy at the 2015 Laurence Olivier Awards. As of September 2021, the show has been running since 2012 in London; since 2014, the play has undertaken five tours of the UK.

Plot 
Before the play starts the audience see the backstage staff doing last-minute adjustments to the set, including trying to mend a broken mantelpiece and find a dog that has run off.

The fictitious Cornley Polytechnic Drama Society (Cornley University in the American version), fresh from such hits as Two Sisters, The Lion and The Wardrobe, Cat, and James and the Peach (or James, Where's your Peach?), has received a substantial bequest and is putting on a performance of The Murder at Haversham Manor – a 1920s murder mystery play, similar to The Mousetrap, which has the right number of parts for the members. The script was written by the fictitious Susie H. K. Brideswell.

During the performance, a play within a play, a plethora of disasters befall the cast, including doors sticking, props falling from the walls, and floors collapsing. Cast members are seen misplacing props, forgetting lines, missing cues, breaking character, having to drink white spirit instead of whisky (paint thinner in the U.S. production), mispronouncing words, stepping on fingers, being hidden in a grandfather clock, and being manhandled off stage. One cast member is knocked unconscious, and her replacement (the group technician) refuses to yield when she returns. In another scene, an actor repeats an earlier line of dialogue, cuing the other actors to repeat the whole dialogue sequence, ever more frenetically, several times. The climax is a tribute to a scene in Buster Keaton's film Steamboat Bill, Jr., when virtually the whole of the remaining set collapses.

Productions

London (2012–present) 
The play premiered at the Old Red Lion Theatre in London in 2012, and moved to Trafalgar Studios in 2013. The play then opened at the Duchess Theatre in the West End on 14 September 2014, where it remains as the longest-running play since the theatre opened in 1929. The direction is by Mark Bell. The cast included Henry Shields as Chris, Dave Hearn as Max, Rob Falconer as Trevor, Henry Lewis as Robert, Charlie Russell as Sandra, Jonathan Sayer as Dennis, Greg Tannahill as Jonathan, and Nancy Zamit as Annie. Sets are designed by Nigel Hook and built by Splinter Scenery. Costumes are designed by Roberto Surace.

UK tours (2014–present) 

The play's first UK tour began in January 2014 (prior to transferring to the Duchess Theatre in the West End) at the Marlowe Theatre in Canterbury featuring the original cast, visiting 17 venues and ending in Darlington in July.

It began a second UK tour from January 2017, starting at the Theatre Royal in Bath, ending at the Cambridge Arts Theatre in August.

A third UK tour occurred in 2018, starting at Royal and Derngate, Northampton.

A fourth UK tour commenced on 13 July 2021 at the Marlowe Theatre Canterbury, and concluded at the Waterside Theatre Aylesbury on 27 November 2021.

The fifth UK tour began at the Theatre Royal in Bath in April 2022. The original West End cast returned to this touring production for two weeks in Manchester and Newcastle.

Broadway (2017–2019) 
The play opened on Broadway on 2 April 2017, with previews that began on 9 March 2017 at the Lyceum Theatre. The production featured the original London cast, and film director J. J. Abrams made his debut as a theatrical producer. The production closed on 6 January 2019, after 745 regular performances and 27 previews.

Australian tour (2017) 
A touring production began in Australia at the Comedy Theatre in Melbourne from February 2017, before heading to Adelaide, Sydney, Canberra, Brisbane and Perth.

US Tour (2018) 
The play toured North America, starting in September 2018 in Pittsburgh, Pennsylvania. The original tour cast included Brandon J. Ellis as Trevor, Evan Alexander Smith as Chris, Yaegel T. Welch as Jonathan, Peyton Crim as Robert, Scott Cote as Dennis, Jamie Ann Romero as Sandra, Ned Noyes as Max, and Angela Grovey as Annie. Also on the tour as understudies were Michael Thatcher, Sid Solomon, Blair Baker, and Jacqueline Jarrold.

The Second National tour launched in the fall of 2019 and continued until the COVID-19 pandemic caused it to shut down ahead of schedule. Cast members included Chris Lanceley as Chris, Chris French as Jonathan, Michael Thatcher as Robert, Jacqueline Jarrold as Sandra, Todd Buonopone as Dennis, and Adam Petherbridge as Max. Bianca Horn initially played Annie before returning to the Off-Broadway company. She was replaced by Ashley D. Kelley. Jason Bowen also initially played Trevor before swapping places with off-Broadway's Ryan Vincent Anderson.

The national tour is anticipated to go out again in 2023 with a stop at Washington D.C.'s Kennedy Center.

Off-Broadway (2019 – Present) 
The Broadway production transferred Off-Broadway to New World Stages on 11 February 2019. On 12 March 2020, production was suspended due to the COVID-19 pandemic until it reopened on 15 October 2021.

Chicago (2021–2022) 
In lieu of a 2021–2022 national tour, a sit down production was launched at Chicago's Broadway Playhouse. The production opened in December 2021 and closed on 21 May 2022.

TV specials 

Two television specials, an adaptation of Peter Pan Goes Wrong and a sequel titled A Christmas Carol Goes Wrong, aired on BBC One in December 2016 and 2017.

A TV series, The Goes Wrong Show, followed in 2019. In December 2019, a full series of "The Goes Wrong Show" was broadcast featuring 6 episodes with the same cast as the other two TV specials. Each episode was said to have received an average of 2.2 million people watching it when broadcast.

Following the success of the first series, the BBC commissioned a second series which premiered its first episode on 27 September 2021.

Roles and principal casts

Casts

Characters 
 Chris Bean, who plays Inspector Carter and serves as the show's director, set designer, costume designer, prop maker, box office manager, press and PR person, dramaturgy, voice coach, dialect coach, and fight choreographer and filled in for the role of Mr. Fitzroy during rehearsals
 Jonathan Harris, who plays Charles Haversham
 Robert Grove, who plays Thomas Colleymoore
 Dennis Tyde, who plays Perkins
 Sandra Wilkinson, who plays Florence Colleymoore
 Max Bennett, who plays both Cecil Haversham and Arthur the Gardener
 Trevor Watson, the lighting and sound operator
 Annie Twilloil, the stage manager

Awards and nominations

Original London production

Original Broadway production

Off Broadway production

Reception 
The Play That Goes Wrong received positive reviews. Tim Walker of The Telegraph gave it four out of five stars, calling it "a great-looking, brilliantly performed piece" and stated that "I have seldom, if ever, heard louder or more sustained laughter in a theatre." Mark Shenton of the London Theatre gave it four out of five stars, stating that though the play would not appeal to everyone, "you cannot fail to admire the ceaseless energy of the cast", and shared that "the real surprise is just how well-sustained the joke is."

Sarah Hemming of the Financial Times gave the play four out of five stars, noting its shared lineage with plays such as Noises Off and stated that "It's not new then, but it is often very funny." Though she found areas in the play that needed improvement ("it would be funnier if it started more subtly, rather than at full tilt.... The company could also make more of offstage dynamics"), she considered the play to be "largely a joyous show."

The Broadway production of The Play That Goes Wrong won the 2017 Tony Award for Best Scenic Design in a Play.

International 
The Play That Goes Wrong has been translated and licensed for productions in over 30 other countries, namely China, Hungary, Poland, Spain, Greece, Israel, Scandinavia, France, Italy, Iceland, Brazil, Germany, Austria, Belgium, The Netherlands, Mexico, Argentina, Uruguay, Colombia, Turkey, New Zealand, Hong Kong, Singapore, Philippines, Puerto Rico, South Africa, Slovakia, Slovenia, South Korea, Portugal (UAU), Croatia, Russia, India (Natak na Natak nu Natak by Sharman Joshi Productions), Cyprus and the Czech Republic.

References

External links 
Internet Broadway Database

Laurence Olivier Award-winning plays
2012 plays
West End plays
Mischief Theatre